The Mind at Work is a book by Mike Rose about the intellectual lives of everyday workers.

References

External links 

 
 Interview with author

American non-fiction books
2005 non-fiction books
Ethnographic literature
English-language books
Viking Press books